Fabio Fognini was the defending champion, but he chose to compete in Umag instead.

Nicolás Jarry won his first ATP Tour singles title, defeating Juan Ignacio Londero in the final, 7–6(9–7), 6–4.

Seeds
The top four seeds receive a bye into the second round. 

Note: Pablo Carreño Busta, who entered late and played in the qualifying tournament, would have been seeded fifth if he had entered the tournament prior to the initial entry cutoff date of 3 June 2019.

Draw

Finals

Top half

Bottom half

Qualifying

Seeds

Qualifiers

Qualifying draw

First qualifier

Second qualifier

Third qualifier

Fourth qualifier

External links
 Main Draw
 Qualifying Draw

2019 ATP Tour
2019 Singles